The flame-rumped sapphire (Hylocharis pyropygia) is a doubtfully valid species of hummingbird in the family Trochilidae known only from Brazil. Today few authorities accept it as valid, instead believing it represents a hybrid between Chlorostilbon lucidus and Hylocharis cyanus.

References
 BirdLife International 2004. 2006 IUCN Red List of Threatened Species.   Downloaded on 10 July 2007.

Hylocharis
Controversial hummingbird taxa
Birds of Brazil
Taxonomy articles created by Polbot
flame-rumped sapphire
flame-rumped sapphire
flame-rumped sapphire
Taxobox binomials not recognized by IUCN